Diclidia is a genus of false flower beetles in the family Scraptiidae. There are about 11 described species in Diclidia.

Species
These 11 species belong to the genus Diclidia:
 Diclidia gilva Liljeblad, 1921
 Diclidia greeni Liljeblad, 1918
 Diclidia inyoensis Liljeblad, 1921
 Diclidia laetula (LeConte, 1858)
 Diclidia liljebladi
 Diclidia mexicana Ray
 Diclidia obscura Liljeblad, 1945
 Diclidia propinqua Liljeblad, 1918
 Diclidia sexmaculata Liljeblad, 1945
 Diclidia sordida Liljeblad, 1945
 Diclidia spinea Liljeblad, 1945

References

Further reading

 
 

Scraptiidae
Articles created by Qbugbot